Puning (Chinese: 普宁 / 普寧; Mandarin: Pǔníng; Teochew: Pou2 leng5), officially Puning City, is a county-level city located in Eastern Guangdong, China, under the administration of the city, Jieyang. Nevertheless, its administrative power in economic matters is comparable to that of prefecture-level cities. Puning is geographically situated on the west rim of Chaoshan Plain, leaning against the stretching branch of the Lianhua Mountains at its southwest border, and 90 percent of its territory sits on the south of the Tropic of Cancer. The city has a population of 2.5089 million under its household registration system hukou, marking the largest in all county-level cities in China. Puning's downtown residents amount to 581,900, behind Yiwu, while the entire city's resident population of 1.9986 million is second to cities Kunshan and Jinjiang. It is concurrently the ancestral hometown of 1.95 million overseas Chinese people and 1.4 million 'returned overseas Chinese people' (overseas Chinese who 'returned' to China and/or regained Chinese citizenship) and family members of overseas Chinese people.

Puning, having been a key trade hub in eastern Guangdong, was upgraded from county to city status in 1993. It is one of the first 'Chinese textile cities' and where the project 'Chinese TCM Cities' was first launched. Textile and apparel and medicine industries are local pillars, topping or coming second in Guangdong county economies since 2003. It also entered the list of the One Hundred Best Counties and Cities for Health Industry in 2020 by Xiaokang series of Qiushi magazine.

Historically, Puning was one of the eight counties of Chaozhou (Teochew) Prefecture. In the mid-1900s, the Hakka region, which was historically part of the Huizhou Prefecture, was incorporated into Puning's territory. Subsequently, the city also welcomed back 'returned overseas Chinese' and 'family members of overseas Chinese' due to the political situation in Southeast Asia. The cultures of the various clans formed the multilingual, multicultural landscape of Puning, where customs and traditions differ across the towns and villages. It is recognised as a Chinese Folk Cuture Art Village by the Ministry of Culture, China.

Etymology
'Puning' is the pinyin transliteration of the city in Standard Chinese, also known as Mandarin or putonghua. It is also known as 'Pou Leng', Poh Leng, or Pho Leng in the Chaoshan language, also known as Chaozhou or Teochew. It was named after the historical county of the same name, which dates back to the Ming dynasty of China. According to Puning Xian Zhilue (A Brief Account of Puning County), Guangdong Tongzhi (Comprehensive Records of Guangdong), Ming Shi (History of Ming), and Chao Zhong Zaji (Miscellaneous Accounts of Chaozhou), the name 'Puning' was given in 1563, after the phrase pubian ningmi, meaning universally serene. Versions mentioned the county's original name as Pu'an or Anpu, but this was refuted by an inscription on the external walls of a Lords of the Three Mountains temple in Guiyu, Chaoyang, discovered in 1986.

In 1949, the seat of Puning County was administered as Puning City. The City's territory was split in 1950. In 1993, Puning County upgraded to become Puning City, while the original 'Puning City' became its city centre.

History

Before its founding

The habitation of humans in the territory of Puning dates back to the New Stone Age, evident in archaeological findings, such as the Hutou Pu Old Kilns Site (虎头埔古窑址) in Mianyuan Village, Guangtai Town, discovered in 1982. The tomb of a Sinicised Baiyue person, discovered in Songbaiwei Village, Lihu Town, illustrates that by the end of the Eastern Han period, Central Plains (Zhongyuan) culture had been introduced into Puning.

During the Pre-Qin era, the succeeding political regimes on Zhongyuan did not have any de facto administration of Puning and its surrounding regions. It was incorporated into Zhongyuan territories during the Qin and Han dynasties, but there had never been any clear administrative borders in the regions.

Ming and Qing

In 1558, Zhang Lian started a rebellion in Raoping and Dabu of eastern Chaozhou (Teochew) Prefecture and subsequently declared himself Emperor of the Feilong Empire. It was suppressed by the Ming Government in 1562.

Republic of China

Beijing Government

Xinhai Revolution and Constitutional Protection War
In October 1911, the National Revolution Army (NRA) started a rebellion in Wuchang, while Fang Cishi (1887-1915) of the Tongmenghui dispatched troops in Puning. Guangdong declared its independence from the Qing Empire the following month and abolished the Chaozhou Prefecture, rendering counties such as Puning under the control of the Governor of Guangdong. Liu Renchen from the Tongmenghui also led his troops into Puning's city area. As a result, there were 13 different rival commanding officers in the Chaoshan region, all from different factions of the NRA. Meanwhile, influential figures in the county Puning supported Fang Zhiting as the county chief, while Zhao Diyun was, on the other hand, appointed Chief of Civil Affairs by Fang Cishi under the name of the Chaoshan Military Government. However, Zhao's appointment was short-lived as he was hindered by local officials and influential figures. In April 1912, the Deputy Governor of Guangdong, Chen Jiongming, sent his trusted aide, Chen Juemin, as the Civil Affairs Chief. The administrative division of Chaodun Circuit was established in 1914 and Puning was drawn into it; the Circuit was abolished in 1920.

In 1917, Duan Qirui led his troops to attack southern China after he abolished the Provisional Constitution of the Republic of China, while Sun Yat-sen established the Constitutional Protection Junta in Guangzhou, sparking the Constitutional Protection Movement. Both armies fought outside the city walls of Puning, in the villages of Wuli and Minggang. On 25 May 1921, Puning was brought under the control of Chen Jiongming's forces once again.

National Revolution

On 12 March 1925, Chiang Kai-shek, He Yingqin, and Zhou Enlai led the National Revolutionary Army (NRA) to defeat Chen's forces in Lihu of eastern Puning. On 2 November 1925, the NRA arrived in the city area of Puning, and Zhou made speeches there to raise funds for the army. On the same year, the Government of the Republic of China in Guangzhou announced that the Chaozhou (Teochew) and Meizhou regions came under the rule of the Chinese Nationalist Party (Kuomintang; KMT). Fang Zhiting was appointed the chief of Puning while Fang Zhanying became the acting Prosecutor.

The Puning Farmers' Association established the Farmers' Free City under the Peifeng Tower located in the suburb in February 1926, and founded the Farmers' Self-Defence Army in December of the same year, attacking the city twice.

The Shanghai massacre in April 1927 had a repercussion on the county of Puning. The Chinese Communist Party (CCP)'s Puning branch joined forces with left-wing KMT members to stage an armed riot on 23 April, and subsequently set up the first county-level revolutionary regime led by the CCP through armed conflict three days later at the Chen (Tan) clan ancestral shrine in Jiujiang, Daba. The CCP declared war against Chiang Kai-shek in a public address to the Chinese nation. However, the Farmers' Free City regime and the CCP's Provisional People's Government regime ceased their activities as they lost their battle to the KMT.

Nanjing Government

Civil war and infrastructure development
In October 1927, the Nanchang Uprising forces retreated to Liusha and conducted a military conference in Liusha Christian Church on 3 October. The uprising forces were attacked and defeated by Chen Jitang's forces.

In 1928, Peng Pai led the Chinese Workers' and Peasants' Revolutionary Army into Puning and met up with remnant forces of the Nanchang Uprising, to discuss setting up a revolutionary base in the Dananshan Mountain area.

War against Japanese Army

Resumption of civil war and communist takeover

People's Republic of China

Geography

Climate

Politics and administration

Administrative divisions

Economy

Demographics

Education

Culture

Cuisine

Architecture

Literature

Festivals

Sports

Transport

Attractions

Notable people from Puning
 Cai Cheng - Chinese politician
 Ke Hua - Chinese politician, diplomat, and father of Ke Lingling
 Ke Lingling - former wife of Xi Jinping and daughter of Ke Hua
 Chuang Shih-ping - Chinese-born Hong Kong businessman
 Chan Tung - Chinese-born Hong Kong celebrity chef and TV host
 Chen Xinren - Chinese diplomat
 Zheng Zeguang - current Chinese Ambassador to the United Kingdom
 Zhou Zhenhong - Chinese politician
 Fang Zong'ao - Chinese scholar, economist, jurist, law professor, and economics professor

Sister cities
As of May 2013, Puning established friendly relations with seven other cities in mainland China.

Notes

References

 
County-level cities in Guangdong
Jieyang